Aaramta (عرمتى)   is a village in the Jezzine District  in southern Lebanon.

History
In  the 1596 tax records, it was named as a village,  'Aramta, in the Ottoman nahiya (subdistrict) of  Sagif   under the liwa' (district) of Safad, with a population of  14 households, all Muslim. The villagers paid a fixed tax-rate of 25% on agricultural products, such as wheat, barley, fruit trees,  goats and beehives, in addition to "occasional revenues"; a total of 1,355  akçe.

On 14 April 1994 three SLA militiamen were killed by a landmine near the village. In response the SLA shelled Sidon killing three civilians. Two days later the SLA attacked Aaramta killing two people and expelling the villagers to Jezzine. Five SLA men had been killed the same day near Jezzine.

References

Bibliography

External links
Aaramta, Localiban

Populated places in Jezzine District